Pathinettam Padi is a 2019 Indian Malayalam-language coming of age drama film, written and directed by Shankar Ramakrishnan and produced by Shaji Nadesan under the banner of August Cinema.The film features Chandunadh, Ahaana Krishna, Akshay Radhakrishnan, Ashwin Gopinath, Wafa Khatheeja Rahman and Arsha Baiju in the lead and Mammootty, Prithviraj Sukumaran, Arya, and Unni Mukundan in cameo roles. The film gained positive response.

The film was released in theaters on 5 July 2019.

Plot
Students of two schools in Trivandrum, Kerala, India that cater to different economical classes are in a tussle. While one set struggles for survival, the other is busy finding joy in drugs. The two groups keep finding reasons to mess with each other. Will they find the purpose of their lives amid the chaos?

Cast

Mammootty as John Abraham Palakkal (Extended Cameo Appearance)
Prithviraj Sukumaran as Ashwin Vasudev (Extended Cameo Appearance)
Arya as Major Ayyappan, a Military officer (Extended Cameo Appearance)
Unni Mukundan as District Collector Ajith Nair IAS (Extended Cameo Appearance)
Priyamani as Gouri Vasudev, Ashwin's sister (Extended Cameo Appearance)
Ashwin Gopinath as Young Ashwin Vasudev
Akshay Radhakrishnan as Young Ayyappan
Ambi Neenasam as Attukal Suran
Sreechand Suresh as Young Ajith Nair/Aji
Aswathlal as Sakhavu Abhayan
Sumesh Moor as Ambotty
Sandeep Pradeep as Puthran
Vijeesh as Kombi
Sandeep as Don
Yadav Shashidhar
Sangeeth as Duke
Chandunath G Nair as Joy Abraham Palakkal
Abhinand Girish as Abhi
Aarsha Chandini Baiju as Devi
Wafa Khadeeja Rahman as Angel
Nakul Thampi as Sony
Adam as Screw George
Ashish Pillai as Godfrey
Harisankar SG as Tittumon
Ankit Harikrishnan as Kiran D
Fahim Safar as Ibru / Kunjikka
Jitin Puthanchery as Giri
Vishnu Vijayakumar as Priest
Suraj Venjaramoodu as Minister  Kaniyapuram Narendran
Ahaana Krishna as Annie
Saniya Iyappan as Saniya
Biju Sopanam as Shalamon Abraham Palakkal
Mukundan as V Joseph
Parvathi T. as Susan Abraham Palakkal
Manoj K Jayan as Stanlin Moore
Lalu Alex as Nandhan Menon
Nandhu as H.C Vijayan, Ayyappan's father
Muthumani as Ayyappan's mother, Teacher
Maniyanpilla Raju as Sudheer Kumar(Invigilator)
Shaji Nadeshan as School Manager
Harini as Anna Jones
Vivek Premachandran as Monty
George Pulikkan as Fr Pulikkan
Gautham Padmanabhan as Aby Mullassery
Anagha Ashok as Divya
Krishnendhu as Ayyappan's s sister
Chandrakumar Sadanandhan as Ambili Annan
Sharath Jayaprakash as Magician Patteri
Rohit Kumar Regmi as Neppali
Sharran Puthumana as Annie's brother
Krishnan Balakrishnan as Achuthan, Aji's father
Dhanya Varma as Dhanu (Journalist)
Mithun Abraham as Captain Santhosh Kumar
Parvathy Prann as Paru

 
Rajeev Pillai as Monty's brother/Drug Lord (Cameo Appearance)

Production
Shooting began in January 2019 and movie was released in India on 5 July 2019.

Reception
Manoj Kumar R of The Indian Express gave 3.5 out of 5 and wrote - The film is crammed with characters and subplots that leave you overwhelmed. Is this the story about Ashwin Vasudev who overcame his flaws to build a school that challenges the conventional idea of education? Or is it the story of Ayyappan, who remembers his first love after taking a bullet near his chest in a gun battle at the border? Or it must be about students who abuse drugs? No wait, it is about Mammootty's John Abraham Palakkal taking on the flawed educational system? Actually, it’s about everything and everyone. It is just too much. The background score of the film is also so confusing as it is hard to tell the heroes from the villains. Even the bad guys get to deliver lengthy punchlines, walk in slow motion, and strike action poses.

S R Praveen of The Hindu called the movie an unrealistic depiction of student rivalry in schools and wrote - At the core of the film is the long-standing rivalry between student gangs belonging to two schools in Trivandrum city. It is the kind of rivalry which seems quite unreal for school students, even in a masala entertainer, mainly due to the level of violence involved. Notwithstanding the fact that some of these stylized stunts are aesthetically shot or well-choreographed, these scenes don’t belong in a movie about school students. Similarly, the five-star hangouts of the international school students, complete with an 'item song' also looks far removed from reality. The characters of the girls are relegated to the background, with hardly any of them getting a line or two to utter. Too many characters make their appearance, but only a couple of them are written with any depth to them. The whole bunch of newcomers do show promise, lighting up the screen with their infectious energy, even as the script, written by director Shanker Ramakrishnan himself, sags.

References

External links

2010s Malayalam-language films
Films shot in Thiruvananthapuram

2019 films